Sir Frederick William George White  (26 May 1905 – 17 August 1994) was a New Zealand-born Australian physicist and ornithologist who was Chairman of CSIRO from 1959 to 1970.

Education and early life
White was born in 1905 in Johnsonville. He received his education at Wellington College and Victoria University College. Due to his academic performance, he won a scholarship from the University of New Zealand, and this award enabled him to attend St John's College, Cambridge, where he studied under Ernest Rutherford.

Career and research
He taught at King's College London from 1932, and was lecturer at Canterbury College in Christchurch, New Zealand, from 1937. During World War II, White worked on secret projects developing radar in New Zealand and Australia.

Awards and honours
In the 1954 New Year Honours, he was appointed a Commander of the Order of the British Empire (CBE). In the 1962 Birthday Honours, this was elevated to the class of Knight Commander of the same order (KBE).

Personal life 
White died in Melbourne on 17 August 1994. His wife Elizabeth had died two years prior.

References

External links
 Australian Dictionary of Biography
 CSIROpedia

Fellows of the Australian Academy of Science
Australian physicists
1905 births
1994 deaths
Knights Commander of the Order of the British Empire
People educated at Wellington College (New Zealand)
Victoria University of Wellington alumni
Academics of King's College London
Academic staff of the University of Canterbury
CSIRO people
New Zealand Fellows of the Royal Society